Kevin N. Dalby is an American pharmacist, who is currently the Johnson & Johnson Centennial Professor at University of Texas at Austin. He examines fundamental mechanisms underlying human diseases to develop new treatments while also teaching and motivating students to conduct research.  

Dalby is a member of several professional societies, including the American Society for Biochemistry and Molecular Biology, the American Chemical Society, and the American Association for Cancer Research.  

In service to the country, Dalby serves on the National Institute of Health's study sections and is a peer reviewer for many leading journals.  

Dalby's primary research goal is to discover and characterize fundamental mechanisms that regulate molecular signaling in cancer. As the Johnson & Johnson Centennial Professor of Chemical Biology & Medicinal Chemistry, he leads a team that uses a wide array of chemical, biochemical, biophysical, and physiological experiments to study phenomena of signal transduction.  

His laboratory seeks to discover new cell signaling processes and develop new molecular tools to facilitate investigations. For 20 years, Dalby has led a laboratory that has studied protein kinase signaling, reporting several foundational studies about mechanisms of protein kinase regulation, substrate specificity, and inhibition in that time.

References

Year of birth missing (living people)
Living people
University of Texas at Austin faculty
American pharmacists